The Yemeni film industry produced over five feature films in 2014. This article fully lists all non-pornographic films, including short films, that had a release date in that year and which were at least partly made by Yemen. It does not include films first released in previous years that had release dates in 2014.  Also included is an overview of the major events in Yemeni film, including film festivals and awards ceremonies, as well as lists of those films that have been particularly well received, both critically and financially.

Minor releases

See also

 2014 in film
 2014 in Yemen

References

External links

Yemeni
Films

Yemen